The Baltimore Saturday Visiter was a weekly periodical in Baltimore, Maryland, in the 19th century. It published some of the early work of Baltimore writer Edgar Allan Poe.

History
It was established in 1832 by Charles Cloud and Lambert Wilmer, a friend of Poe.  Popular at first, the Visiter later became abolitionist and in 1847 was absorbed by the abolitionist National Era of Washington D.C.

Poe submitted to the Visiter six tales as entries to a contest sponsored by the publication. The newspaper promised a $50 prize for the best tale and a $25 prize for the best poem submitted by October 1, 1833. About 100 entries were received but the judges chose Poe's "MS. Found in a Bottle" for its originality. In addition to the $50 prize, the story was published in the October 19 issue of the Visiter. The contest, however, had some controversy. The winner of the poetry portion of the contest, "Henry Wilton," was revealed to actually be John Hewitt, the editor of the Visiter. Poe claimed Hewitt had won by "underhanded means."

Notes
 Alternately named the Saturday Morning Visiter (1832–33), Baltimore Saturday Visiter (1833–34), Baltimore Visiter (1834–40), Saturday Morning Visiter (1840–41), and Saturday Morning Visitor (1841–47).

References

General
Entry for Baltimore Saturday Visiter.  Guide to Maryland Newspapers.  Maryland State Archives.  Jan. 15, 2007.
Entry for Baltimore Saturday Visitor.  Guide to Maryland Newspapers.  Maryland State Archives.  Jan. 15, 2007.
Entry for Baltimore Visiter.  Guide to Maryland Newspapers.  Maryland State Archives.  Jan. 15, 2007.
Entry for Saturday Morning Visiter.  Guide to Maryland Newspapers.  Maryland State Archives.  Jan. 15, 2007.

Hall, Clayton Colman.   Baltimore: Its History and Its People vol. 1. Lewis Historical Publishing Co. Digitized Sept. 11, 2006. p. 712, Retrieved Jan. 28, 2007.

Defunct literary magazines published in the United States
Edgar Allan Poe
Magazines established in 1832
Magazines disestablished in 1847
Magazines published in Baltimore
Poetry magazines published in the United States
Weekly magazines published in the United States